Vagabonds RUFC also known as simply Vagabonds or by their nickname Vagas is a rugby union club located in Douglas, Isle of Man. They are affiliated with the English Rugby Football Union and currently play in the South Lancs/Cheshire 3 division following their relegation from South Lancs/Cheshire 2 at the end of the 2017–18 season.

Club history 
Vagabonds was established in 1965 as Douglas High School Old Boys by school master John Timson, and was made up of current and former players from the Douglas High School rugby team. Soon, the name Vagabonds was adopted (see below). In October 1980, the club moved to a site on Glencrutchery Road, adjacent to the famous TT Grandstand. 31 years later in 2011, the club moved to its current site at Ballafletcher, where the club has a modern clubhouse, changing facilities and two pitches. The 2015/16 season was the Vagabonds 50th Anniversary season

Honours
North-West West 3 champions: 1989–90
North-West West 2 champions: 1990–91
North West 2 champions: 1995–96

Origin of the name 
When the club was formed, it was forced to train and play on the rugby pitches nearby because it had no grounds of its own. These pitches were then owned by Douglas Rugby Club (and still are to this day). Due to this lack of a home, the name 'Vagabonds' was soon adopted. Also, due to the sharing of a pitch for many years, a fierce rivalry now exists between Douglas Rugby Club and Vagabonds. Since 2019, the second XV have been known as the "Hornets" due to the black and gold striped kits they wear.

2013 Shield Winners 
Vagabonds B Team won the Manx Shield in 2013 after a 10-year wait following victory over Castletown in terrible weather conditions. The success was well met around the league as Vagabonds are such a popular and well thought of club amongst their peers. The chino's were worn with pride that evening by all members of the squad.

Team colours 
The traditional club colours are black, white and gold. The current first team kit consists of a white jersey with a gold band across the chest along with the club crest and sponsor (currently local telecommunications company; Sure), black shorts and black and gold striped socks. The Hornets kit is a black and gold striped design. The Second XV kit is sponsored by Colbournes. Both kits are manufacture by Canterbury.

See also 
Rugby union in the Isle of Man
Isle of Man Sport
Castletown Rugby Club
Douglas Rugby Club
Ramsey Rugby Club
Southern Nomads Rugby Club
Western Vikings Rugby Club

External links
Official Website

Rugby union in the Isle of Man
Manx rugby union teams
Rugby clubs established in 1965
1965 establishments in the Isle of Man